Eckhart Mines is an unincorporated community and census-designated place (CDP) in Allegany County, Maryland, United States. As of the 2010 census it had a population of 932.

Braddock Run begins near Eckhart Mines. The town was founded as a company town for the nearby Eckhart Mines. According to the Maryland Mining Heritage Guide, it was "the first coal company town in Maryland."

The original owner was George Eckhardt, an immigrant from Germany.

The outcrop of the Pittsburgh coal seam here is known locally as "the big vein" or the "14 foot coal". The Eckhart Mines' location here was the first bituminous coal mine developed in the Georges Creek Valley coalfield, because this is where the National Road (now U.S. Route 40 Alternate) crossed the coal outcrop. The Eckhart operation was known as the Maryland Mining Company, which eventually combined with other companies to form the Consolidation Coal Company (now Consol Energy). The Eckhart operation was the first commercial coal company in the United States.

Demographics

History
In 1780 George Eckhart secured lots 3644, 3645, 3646, in Allegany County. These lots were patented to him in 1800. He also had surveyed to him lot 3694, which he secured from John Stigler, to whom these lots had been awarded. [2]

A little village sprang up on George's land known as Eckhart Mines, which tradition says was named for him. Here he and his wife Mary lived, reared their family and died.  The family cemetery is still located in the fields not far from the location of the original homestead.

A history of Allegany County, page 448, says that "'Eckhart Mines', was a well laid out village 1789, July 12. This mining village is about one and a half miles from Frostburg, is on the Eckhart Branch of the Cumberland and Pennsylvania Railroad in the basin of the Big Savage and Dan's Mt. and is very picturesquely situated." The report given in 1940 is, that there are ten stores there, four of them being general merchandise, several being grocery stores, and two churches, the Baptist and the United Methodist churches. The population was 2300 people.

The first German Lutheran Church built in Eckhart was built of stone on land given by the Eckharts. It has long since gone into decay. Eckhart Mines was a mining district and had large beds of very rich coal underneath, but the land was stolen from the Eckhart family and two of their family members were poisoned. It is now owned by the Continental Coal Company.

References

 Tom Robertson, Frostburg, Arcadia Publishing 2002, 
2.  Liiber. I. C. No.P. folio 43

Census-designated places in Allegany County, Maryland
Census-designated places in Maryland
Populated places in the Cumberland, MD-WV MSA
Coal towns in Maryland
Cumberland, MD-WV MSA
Company towns in Maryland